The following lists events that happened in 1944 in El Salvador.

Incumbents
President: Maximiliano Hernández Martínez (until 9 May), Andrés Ignacio Menéndez (9 May – 21 October), Osmín Aguirre y Salinas (starting 21 October)
Vice President: Vacant

Events

January
 3 January – Voters in El Salvador voted Maximiliano Hernández Martínez as President of El Salvador for a third term in a 100% margin but to results were published. He was the only candidate. The 1944 Salvadoran Constitutional Assembly election also but no results were posted either.

April
 2 April – Rouge military units rebelled against President Maximiliano Hernández Martínez. 
 4 April – The rebellion was suppressed and more than 100 civilians were shot dead in street demonstrations by the army.

May
 7 May – The Strike of Fallen Arms began against Hernández Martínez's government.
 9 May – Maximiliano Hernández Martínez resigned and fled to Guatemala. Andrés Ignacio Menéndez became Provisional President.
 11 May – The Strike of Fallen Arms ends.

November
 21 October – Osmín Aguirre y Salinas deposed Andrés Ignacio Menéndez in a coup and became Provisional President.

Births 
 22 March – Octavio Ortiz, Catholic priest (d. 1979)
 18 June – Salvador Sánchez Cerén, politician

References

 
El Salvador
1940s in El Salvador
Years of the 20th century in El Salvador
El Salvador